Federal elections were held in Germany on 16 June 1898. Despite the Social Democratic Party (SPD) receiving the most votes, the Centre Party remained the largest party in the Reichstag after winning 102 of the 397 seats, whilst the SPD won just 56. Voter turnout was 68.1%.

Results

Alsace-Lorraine

References

Federal elections in Germany
Elections in the German Empire
Germany
1898 elections in Germany
June 1898 events